Punjab Engineering College (abbreviated PEC or PEC Chandigarh) is a public research & technical institution in Chandigarh. It was founded in 1921 in Lahore, established in Chandigarh in 1953, and focuses on the field of applied sciences, particularly engineering and technology. It is known for its two-year and four-year programmes for which the entry is through the Joint Entrance Examination – Mains and Graduate Aptitude Test in Engineering. It offers degrees such as Bachelor of Technology, Master of Technology, and a few others. It also has a comprehensive graduate program offering doctoral degrees in Science, Technology, Engineering and Mathematics.

History

PEC was established in 1921 in Mughalpura, a suburb of Lahore, Punjab, erstwhile British India as the Mughalpura Technical College. In 1923, the name was changed to Maclagan Engineering College to honour Sir Edward Maclagan, the then Governor of Punjab, who laid the foundation stone of the building. In 1939, the name was again changed to Punjab College of Engineering and Technology.

In 1932 the institution became affiliated with the University of Punjab for awarding a bachelor's degree in engineering. After partition in 1947, the college was relocated to Roorkee in India and was renamed East Punjab College of Engineering. In the year 1950, the word East was dropped. Towards the end of December 1953, the college shifted to its present campus in Chandigarh as an affiliated campus of Panjab University. In 1966, with the formation of the Union Territory of Chandigarh, the college came under the control of the Government of India through the Chandigarh Administration. In October 2003, the Government of India recognized the college as a Deemed University and thereafter it became known as Punjab Engineering College (Deemed University). In 2009, the Board of Governors renamed the institution PEC University of Technology. However, as per a recent notification released by the University Grants Commission (India), the institution has been ordered to drop the word "University" from its name. The institute has reverted to its former name Punjab Engineering College (Deemed-to-be-University).

In 1994 this institution was adjudged the best technical college in India by the National Foundation of Engineers. It occupies an area of 146 acres.  Up to 1962, the college consisted of three departments of Civil, Electrical and Mechanical Engineering. Thereafter the college expanded and offers Bachelor of Engineering degrees in various specializations.

Highway Engineering was the first post-graduate course offered by the college, commencing in 1957. Presently there are twelve post-graduate courses leading to a Master of Engineering degree.  Facilities for post-graduate studies exist for regular as well as for part-time students. The college has facilities for research work leading to the award of the PhD degree in engineering in certain selected fields of different disciplines. The college also offers consultancy services in different disciplines.

Academics

Academic programmes 
Institute offers Bachelor of Technology (previously Bachelor of Engineering) in :
Aerospace and Engineering
Civil Engineering
Computer Science Engineering,
Electrical Engineering
Electronics and Communication Engineering
Mechanical Engineering
 Metallurgical Engineering
Production Engineering
Computer Science and Engineering (Data Science)

The institute also offers  Master of Technology degrees'' in the following specializations:

 Computer Science and Engineering (with specialization in AI, Cyber security, Software Engineering, Data Engineering)
 Highways, Structures, Hydraulics and Irrigation, Rotodynamic Machines
 Electrical Power Systems
 Environmental Engineering (Interdisciplinary)
 Electronics Engineering
 Metallurgical Engineering
 TQM, VLSI, Management and Humanities

The institute also awards minor degrees to undergraduates in fields other than their major stream of study.

Collaborations
The college has collaborated with national and international educational institutions for student exchange programs. MoUs have been signed with corporates to attract projects and internships. Some of these collaborations are:
PEC has collaborations with a large number of international companies and universities To name a few such as
 PGIMER, Chandigarh
 NITIE, Mumbai
  Eic Pvt.Ltd., Chandigarh ABB Global Industries & Services Ltd. Bangalore
 Minda Corporation Ltd Noida
 Intel Technologies India Pvt. Ltd., Bangalore, Mumbai
 Central Tool Room, Ludhiana
 CONCAVE Research Centre, Concordia University, Canada
 Central Scientific Instruments Organization, Chandigarh
 Swaraj Division (a unit of FES M&M), Mohali
 MICROSOFT
 Mohali Industries Association, Mohali
 Philips India Ltd.PEC-ESIGELEC France collaboration (Feb, 2009)
MoA between PEC and Siemens Software to develop a centre of excellence at PEC. 
Solar tech Park at PEC campus established in support with Bergen group of Companies
 PEC-ABB collaboration (Jan, 2009)
 PEC-UWA collaboration (Jan, 2009)
 PEC-JCB collaboration initiated (Sep, 2008)
 PEC-Philips collaboration (Sep, 2008)
 PEC-CSIO collaboration (Aug, 2008)

Student life
 Cultural and Technical festivals 
 PEST 
PEST is the annual cultural and technical fest of PEC Chandigarh. The festival started as a cultural event in 2003.

In 2014, PEST merged with VYOM (the technical fest of PEC) and consequently, now acts as an umbrella festival for both cultural and technical events and competitions. 

VYOM
Vyom (earlier known as Technique before being renamed in 2011) was the university's annual technical festival that ran from 2008 to 2014. It was discontinued in 2015 and the technical events are now conducted as part of Pest.

 Student organizations 
Currently, there are 13 technical societies and 12 clubs active in the college, and these are named as:Techonical societies ACM-CSS - Computer Science Society (Recognized under ACM student chapter)
 ATS - Aerospace Technical Society
 ASCE - Americaan Society of Civil Engineers (Student Chapter)
 ASME - Americaan Society of Mechanical Engineers (Student Chapter)
 ASPS - Astronomy and Space Physics Society 
 IEEE - The Institute of Electrical and Electronics Engineers Student Chapter
 IETE - The Institute of Electronics and Telecommunication Engineers Student Forum
 IGS - Indian Geotechnical Society
 IIM - Indian Institute of Metals
 The Robotics Society
 SAE - The Society of Automotive Engineers Student Chapter
 SESI - Solar Energy Society of India
 SME - The Society of Manufacturing Engineers Student ChapterStudents Council  SAC- Students Affairs CouncilClubsNCC (National Cadet Corps) under 2 Chandigarh battalion.
 Projection & Design Club
 Communications Information and Media Cell
 Music Club
 Robotics Club
 Speakers Association And Study Circle
 Dramatics Club
 Art and Photography Club
 Energy and Envirovision Club
 Rotaract Club
 English Editorial Board
 Hindi Editorial Board
 Punjabi Editorial Board
 ImagesCell'''
 Student Counselling Cell (Happy Folks of PEC)
  Entrepreneurship Incubation Cell
 Women Empowerment Cell

Hostels 
There are four hostels for boys and two hostels for girls. Each hostel is self-contained with amenities such as a reading room/indoor games/T.V. room, dining hall and mess. Every hostel has a student chairman (Hostel Senior) for managing and controlling various  activities.

Girls Hostels:

Kalpna Chawla Hostel 
Vindhya Hostel

the Boyss Hostels:

Aravali Hostel
Himalaya Hostel
Kuruksheta Hostel
Shivalik Hostel

Notable alumni 
 Kalpana Chawla - Space Shuttle Columbia astronaut; BE Aeronautical (1982).
 Badshah (Aditya P Singh aka brother of Honey Singh), Punjabi singer and rapper; BE Civil Engineering (2006)
 Sandeep Bakhshi, CEO of ICICI Bank
 Jaspal Bhatti - satirist, comedian, film-maker; BE Electrical (1978).
 Vijay K. Dhir - Dean of the University of California, Los Angeles (UCLA) Henry Samueli School of Engineering and Applied Science
 Adesh Pratap Singh Kairon - Punjab politician 
 Shalabh Kumar - Indian American industrialist and a philanthropist, BS Electronics Engineering (1969)
 Vanya Mishra - Model and Miss India 2012
 Sunil Saigal - Dean, Newark College of Engineering at New Jersey Institute of Technology (NJIT), BE Civil (1978).
 Steve Sanghi - CEO of Microchip Technology BE Electronics (1975)
K. K. Aggarwal -Chairman National Board of Accreditation., MHRD and founder vice chancellor of Guru Gobind Singh Indraprastha University
Vandana Verma - Space Roboticist at NASA
Tim Guleri - American Venture Capitalist.
Anup Chandra Pandey - Election Commissioner of India.

References

External links
 Official PEC website
 http://alumni.pec.ac.in

All India Council for Technical Education
Engineering colleges in Chandigarh
Deemed universities in India
Universities in Chandigarh
1921 establishments in India
Educational institutions established in 1921